Z Cam may refer to:

 Z Camelopardalis, a dwarf nova in the Camelopardalis constellation
 ZCam, a brand of 3D time-of-flight camera products in the 2000s by 3DV Systems